The 2022 New Democratic Party of Prince Edward Island leadership election was held on April 23, 2022. It was initially planned for November 6, 2021, but was postponed. The election was called due to the position being vacated by former leader Joe Byrne. His resignation followed his failed run during 2019 Prince Edward Island general election in District 12, Charlottetown-Victoria Park, losing to Green Party candidate Karla Bernard. Byrne resigned as PEI NDP leader effective September 1, 2020. Michelle Neill was the sole candidate and was elected leader unanimously.

Candidates

Declared 
 Michelle Neill, NDP candidate for Malpeque in the 2021 Canadian Federal Election. Prior to announcing her candidacy, Neill involved herself in community organizations including Wings on Ice Skating Club, the Charlottetown Figure Skating Club, North Star Minor Hockey Association, Skate PEI, and Hockey PEI, and most recently with Mothers Against Drunk Driving (MADD) Central PEI.

 Candidacy announced: January 17, 2022
 Campaign website: None or Unknown
 Neill's campaign message is: “As leader of the Island New Democrats I will be a strong voice in leading this party to be the change that Islanders need and desire.”

See also
New Democratic Party of Prince Edward Island leadership elections

References

External links
 Island New Democrat Leadership Package

New Democratic
Prince Edward Island
New Democratic

New Democratic Party of Prince Edward Island leadership election